Bashgan may refer to:
 Bashgan, Fars
 Bashgan, Kermanshah
 Bashgan, Yazd